Sahanpur is a town and a nagar panchayat in Bijnor district in the Indian state of Uttar Pradesh.

Demographics
, the India census showed Sahanpur had a population of 18,349. Males constitute 52% of the population and females 48%. Sahanpur has an average literacy rate of 37%, lower than the national average of 59.5%: male literacy is 42%, and female literacy is 32%. In Sahanpur, 21% of the population is under 6 years of age.

See also
Mursan
Sahaspur
Kuchesar

References

Cities and towns in Bijnor district